The 1971–72 Cleveland Cavaliers season was the second season of NBA basketball in Cleveland, Ohio. The Cavaliers finished the season with a 23–59 record, finishing last in the Central Division and 7th in the Eastern Conference. Rookie top pick Austin Carr was named to the All-Rookie team and John Johnson and Butch Beard were named All-Stars.

Offseason

Trades
August 13: Forward Greg Howard obtained from the Phoenix Suns in exchange for undisclosed future draft choices and an undisclosed amount of cash.

Draft picks

 Note: This table only lists players drafted through the second round.

Roster

Regular season

Season standings

Record vs. opponents

Game log

October
Record: 2–8 ; Home: 0–6 ; Road: 1–2 ; Neutral: 1–0

November
Record: 6–6 ; Home: 4–2 ; Road: 2–4

December
Record: 7–10 ; Home: 5–4 ; Road: 1–6 ; Neutral: 1–0

January
Record: 1–13 ; Home: 0–5 ; Road: 1–6 ; Neutral: 0–2

February
Record: 4–12 ; Home: 3–6 ; Road: 1–6

March
Record: 3–10 ; Home: 1–5 ; Road: 2–4 ; Neutral: 0–1

|-style="background:#fcc;"
| 9 || October 29, 1971 || Atlanta
| L 97–98
|
|
|
| Cleveland Arena3,442
| 2–7

|-style="background:#cfc;"
| 21 || November 27, 1971 || @ Atlanta
| W 103–95
|
|
|
| Alexander Memorial Coliseum5,101
| 7–14

|-style="background:#cfc;"
| 36 || December 23, 1971 || Atlanta
| W 115–110
|
|
|
| Cleveland Arena4,562
| 12–24

|-style="background:#fcc;"
| 57 || February 5, 1972 || @ Atlanta
| L 117–120
|
|
|
| Alexander Memorial Coliseum6,281
| 17–40

|-style="background:#fcc;"
| 74 || March 12, 1972 || @ Atlanta
| L 114–135
|
|
|
| Alexander Memorial Coliseum4,915
| 21–53
|-style="background:#fcc;"
| 78 || March 19, 1972 || Atlanta
| L 105–115
|
|
|
| Cleveland Arena8,049
| 22–56

Awards and honors
 Austin Carr, NBA All-Rookie Team First Team

References

 Cleveland Cavaliers on Database Basketball
 Cleveland Cavaliers on Basketball Reference

Cleveland
Cleveland Cavaliers seasons
Cleveland
Cleveland